Evelina Stading (January 1, 1797– April 4, 1829), was a Swedish landscape painter.

Biography
Evelina Stading was  born in Stockholm, Sweden. She was  either the daughter or the niece of the opera singer Franziska Stading (1763–1836). Stading studied art in Stockholm as a student of the landscape painter Carl Johan Fahlcrantz and continued her studies in  Germany and Italy. This was unusual for a Swedish female in the 1820s, and something she was admired by her contemporaries as a pioneer by doing. From 1824 to 1827, she studied art in Dresden, and in 1827, she left for Rome via Prague and Florence, travelling in the company of her aunt. She died of a "breast inflammation" in Rome. Her art is preserved in National Museum of Art, Architecture and Design and Östergötlands museum.

References

Further reading
 Dahlberg och Hagström: Svenskt konstlexikon. Allhems Förlag (1953) Malmö.
 I Paris och Rom, 1820-talet i Georg Nordensvan, Svensk konst och svenska konstnärer i nittonde århundradet (1925), I. Från Gustav III till Karl XV
 Carl Nils Daniel Bildt: Svenska minnen och märken Rom. Norstedt, 1900
 Yale Studies in English, Volym 107. Lamson, Wolffe and Company, 1947
 Georg Kaspar Nagler: Neues allgemeines Künstler-Lexicon, Volym 11

1797 births
1829 deaths
Artists from Stockholm
19th-century Swedish painters
19th-century Swedish women artists
Swedish women painters